The 2015 NWSL College Draft was the third annual meeting of National Women's Soccer League (NWSL) franchises to select eligible college players. It was held on January 16, 2015 at the NSCAA Convention in Philadelphia, PA.

Format
Draft order was determined by the final 2014 regular season standings.

Results

Key

Picks

Trades
Round 1:

Round 2:

Round 3:

Round 4:

Summary
In 2015, a total of 24 colleges had players selected. Of these, 11 had a player drafted to the NWSL for the first time: Colorado College, Illinois State, James Madison, Kentucky, Missouri, Northeastern, Seattle, South Carolina, Texas A&M, Washington State and Wisconsin.

Schools with multiple draft selections

Selections by college athletic conference

Selections by position

References

See also
 List of NWSL drafts
 List of National Women's Soccer League draftees by college team
 2015 National Women's Soccer League season

National Women's Soccer League drafts
College Draft
NWSL College Draft
NWSL College Draft
Soccer in Pennsylvania
Sports in Philadelphia
Events in Philadelphia
NWSL College Draft